{{Infobox book
| name              = Hōjōki
| image             = Hōjōki, A Hermit's Hut as Metaphor.jpg
| author            = Kamo no Chōmei
| language          = English
| genre             = Recluse literature, Zuihitsu
| caption           = Book cover of "Hōjōki: A Hermit's Hut as Metaphor by Matthew Stavros
| release_date      = 2020
}}
, variously translated as An Account of My Hut or The Ten Foot Square Hut, is an important and popular short work of the early Kamakura period (1185–1333) in Japan by Kamo no Chōmei. Written in March 1212, the work depicts the Buddhist concept of impermanence (mujō) through the description of various disasters such as earthquake, famine, whirlwind and conflagration that befall the people of the capital city Kyoto. The author Chōmei, who in his early career worked as court poet and was also an accomplished player of the biwa and koto, became a Buddhist monk in his fifties and moved farther and farther into the mountains, eventually living in a 10-foot square hut located at Mt. Hino. The work has been classified both as belonging to the zuihitsu genre and as Buddhist literature. Now considered as a Japanese literary classic, the work remains part of the Japanese school curriculum.

The opening sentence of Hōjōki is famous in Japanese literature as an expression of mujō, the transience of things:The flow of the river never ceases,

And the water never stays the same.

Bubbles float on the surface of pools,

Bursting, re-forming, never lingering. 

They’re like the people in this world and their dwellings. (Stavros)

This invites comparison with the aphorism panta rhei (everything flows) ascribed to Heraclitus, which uses the same image of a changing river, and the Latin adages Omnia mutantur and Tempora mutantur.

The text was heavily influenced by Yoshishige no Yasutane's Chiteiki (982). In addition, Chōmei based his small hut, and much of his philosophical outlook, on the accounts of the Indian sage Vimalakīrti from the Vimalakīrti Sūtra.

 Synopsis 
Chōmei introduces the essay with analogies emphasizing the impermanence of nature, setting a pessimistic view for the rest of this work. He recalls the devastating fire of the Fourth Month of Angen 3 where homes and governmental buildings "turned to ash and dust." Winds picked up the fire and spread the flames throughout the city. Those who were caught near it choked and collapsed. Others instantly died.

Chōmei goes on to recount a great whirlwind that raged on from Nakanomikado and Kyōgoku to Rokujō during the Fourth Month of Jishō 4. The wind blew on for several blocks. No homes were spared; homes were reduced to posts and beams, and others were flattened. The wind blew items, boards, and shingles from the homes into the sky along with dust that obscured it.

The Sixth Month of Jishō 4 brought on a change of the relocation of Japan's capital from Kyoto to Fukuhara. Although people objected, the emperor, ministers and high officials still moved. Those who depended on the capital left with them while others were left behind. Houses went in to ruin, and plots of land became barren fields. Chōmei takes a chance to visit Fukuhara, in which he sees that the city was too crowded for proper streets and nature always beat Fukuhara with violent winds.

Residents complained about the pain of rebuilding in Fukuhara. Officials who usually wear court robes also wear simple clothes now. The uneasiness of disorder set into the capital, and eventually the fears became true. The capital was moved back to Kyoto. The houses of those who moved were never the same.

In the Yōwa era, there was a two-year famine caused by the onslaught of droughts, typhoons, floods and the fact that grains never ripened for harvest. People abandoned their land; some moved to the mountains. Buddhist prayers and rites were performed to remedy the situations but to no effect. Beggars began to fill the streets, and the famine became an epidemic in the second year. Bodies of those who starved lined the streets with almost no passage for horses and carriages. Some tore down their houses for simple resources to sell for spare change; others went to the extent of stealing Buddhist images and temple furnishings to sell. Chōmei reveals that he was born in this age, and he recounts that one of the saddest occurrences is when loved ones died first by starving to feed their family or lovers. Chōmei also gruesomely describes," I also saw a small child who, not knowing that his mother was dead, lay beside her, sucking at her breast." 

The priest Ryugo of Ninna Temple grievingly marked the first letter of the Sanskrit alphabet on the foreheads of the dead to link them to Buddha. He counted their bodies lining from Ichijō of the north to Kujō of the south and Kyōgoku of the east to Suzaku of the west totaling in 42,300 Corpses, although there were more.

A devastating earthquake happened, which caused the mountains to crumble, water to flow onto land, and shrines to be destroyed. The earthquake was so dangerous that people's homes could be crushed at any moment. After the earthquake subsided, there came a period of aftershocks which lasted 3 months. This was during the Saiko era (around 855), when many significant events occurred: the great earthquake, and the head falling from the Buddha at Tōdai Temple.

Chōmei describes the dissatisfaction that is felt by people of lower rank in relation to their status: they face cruel hardships and they are never able to find peace. Chōmei also shares his experiences in this time period. He inherited his paternal grandmother's house and lived there for some time. Then, when he lost his father, he could no longer live in the house, because it reminded him of past memories. Since then, he has created a house only for himself, made of earth materials and bamboo posts. During times of snowfall and wind, his house would be in great danger of falling apart. At the age of 50, Chōmei left his house and became secluded from the world: he was not married and he did not have any children. He did not have any relatives that he felt it would be hard to leave behind. Chōmei was jobless and had no income. Chōmei spent five years living on Mount Ohara. When Chōmei reached the age of 60, he decided to build another house that would last him until the end of his life. This house was significantly smaller than the others he built: only ten feet square in terms of area, and seven feet in height. Land is not necessary for him, according to Chōmei, because with a makeshift house, he can easily move it around.

Chōmei describes how he built a water shelf to place offerings on, bamboo shelves with Japanese poetry, and hung a painting of Amida Buddha. His ten-foot square hut is near the woods in Toyama. His accessibility to the woods makes gathering kindling easier. Chōmei describes that at the base of the mountain is a brushwood hut that houses the caretaker of the mountain and a child. Despite a 50-year age difference, him and the boy are great friends. They go on journeys through the mountain together, visit the Ishiyama temple, and collect offerings. At night, he gets emotional when thinking of his early life and old friends. Chōmei then tells of how he thought his stay in his ten-foot square hut would be temporary. However, he has lived in it for five years and feels as though it is his home. He knows very little of life in the capital and does not relate to the people there. He lacks ambitions and only seeks tranquility. Chōmei describes the type of people people like, and the way he treats his body. When he feels distressed, he rests his body. When he feels strong, he works it. He is also unaffected by society's standards and is not embarrassed by his appearance. Chōmei then goes to say that “The Three Worlds exist in only one mind.” This is based on Buddhist beliefs of three worlds: the world of desire, the world of form, and the world of formlessness.

 Context 

 Transition from the Heian Classical Period to Medieval Japan
Kamo no Chōmei experienced the change of the aristocratic Heian era to the tumultuous Shōgun rule at the age of thirty. Military rulers seized the court and set about a medieval feudal-like structure. During this era, the influence of Buddhism significantly faded. Cyclic cosmology foretold of its decline in which aristocrats enacted the move from city life to reclusion in nature for religious Buddhist pursuits. This impacted Chōmei's decision to a simpler and more devoted existence. As the overpowering rule continues, there is also a transition from optimistic Buddhism to pessimistic Buddhism. This can be seen in Chōmei's work as follows: “All human endeavors are foolish, but among them, spending one’s fortune and troubling one’s mind to build a house in such a dangerous capital is particularly vain.”   Here Chōmei expresses his feelings not only on human motives, but one can see how Chōmei immediately assumes the worst in living at the capital. In context, Chōmei is referring to the great fire that consumed nearly all the houses in Kyoto. From this one experience, he advises others that investing in a residence in a capital is irrational. Another example of Chōmei's pessimistic philosophy is here: “The powerful man is consumed by greed; he who stands alone is mocked. Wealth brings many fears poverty brings cruel hardship. Look to another for help and you will belong to him. Take someone under your wing, and your heart will be shackled by affection.”  

 Denial of Position at Kamo Shrine 
Chōmei, who comes from a respected lineage of Shinto priests, persists in obtaining a post at the Kamo Shrine, where his family legacy was established. However, he fails. Chōmei decides to depart to the mountains even after Emperor Go-Toba establishes an alternate post for him at the temple. This significant event prompted his bleak outlook on life and his decision to become a recluse.

 Structure 

Zuihitsu
Zuihitsu style is a style of writing in which a person is reacting to his or her surroundings. In Hōjōki, the Zuihitsu style is seen as Chōmei is giving his account of what is happening around him and is contemplating on how others are reacting to certain situations. Zuihitsu writings tend to focus on themes that are reflective of the time period in which they're written in. Chōmei focuses on the theme of dissatisfaction that comes from people of lower rank and the hardships they face because of this. “All in all, life in this world is difficult; the fragility and transience of our bodies and dwellings are indeed as I have said. We cannot reckon the many ways in which we trouble our hearts according to where we live and in obedience to our status.”  

Yugen
In Japanese aesthetics, Yūgen is meant to be an exploration of a “mysterious sense of beauty” within the universe, and the sad beauty of human suffering. As Chōmei is describing the great earthquake that occurred in his time period, he reveals this sense of beauty in the universe and the sad beauty of human suffering, which can be seen in the quote, “A dreadful earthquake shook the land. The effects were remarkable. Mountains crumbled and dammed the rivers; the sea tilted and inundated the land. The earth split open and water gushed forth…people who were inside their houses might be crushed in a moment.”  

 Chinese Influences 
Bo Juyi (772-846) was a renowned Chinese poet and a government official of the Tang dynasty. Bo Juyi was known for writing poetry that focused on his career or observations about his everyday life. Bo Juyi can be seen as an influence for Hōjōki, since many his works were done in the observational, Zuihitsu style, in which Hōjōki is written.

 Themes 

 Buddhism 

Mujō
Chōmei immediately begins the work with analogies of a river and a home to show mujō. He explains, “The current of a flowing river does not cease, and yet the water is not the same water as before. The foam floats on stagnant pools, now vanishing, now forming, never stays the same for long. So, too, it is with the people and dwellings of the world.”   Throughout the essay, he draws comparisons to highlight the impermanence of life and events. Buddhist influences are inclusive in Chōmei's work. Chōmei understands Buddha's ideology of not becoming attached to material things, but Chōmei believes is that what is important is the way in which things are dealt with. The actions that people take, or where they go are not really important in life since nothing truly ever lasts. This includes buildings, wealth, and homes.

Dukkha
Chōmei shows dukkha by consistently focusing on the experiences of suffering in life. He says, “All in all, life in this world is difficult… We cannot reckon the many ways in which we trouble our hearts according to where we live and in obedience to our status… Wealth brings many fears; poverty brings cruel hardship.” Asceticism
Significantly, Chōmei's hut, in which this work is named after, is simply a ten-foot square hut. Chōmei illustrates, “In the course of things, years have piled up and my residences have steadily shrunk… In area it is only ten feet square; in height, less than seven feet.” He goes on to say, “I lay a foundation, put up a simple makeshift roof, secure each joint with a latch. This is so I can easily move the building if anything dissatisfies me.”  Chōmei practices in asceticism in which everything he owns is of significance to him, and he values his possessions more.

 Reclusion 
Later in Chōmei's life, he moves to the mountains. Living alone significantly impacts Chōmei's life by allowing him to focus on his connection to Amida Buddha. He describes, “Using what comes to hand, I cover my skin with clothing woven from the bark of wisteria vines and with a hempen quilt, and sustain my life with asters of the field and fruit of the trees on the peak. Because I do not mingle with others I am not embarrassed by my appearance…”  Symbolism 

 Nature 

 Natural Disasters 
“Of all the follies of human endeavor, none is more pointless than expending treasures and spirit to build houses in so dangerous place as the capital.” Chōmei often makes a point that no matter where individuals may be, the world still impacts them. Chōmei believes that the discontent in many people's lives come from the heart and not the environment in which they are in. Because the natural disasters destroy the things people are attached to, people hearts are often disturbed by the loss of their possessions.

 Homes 

 Dwelling 
Chōmei does not believe in any form of permanent home. Often he refers to the concept of “man” and “dwelling.” He believes that a home is symbolic of impermanence. Chōmei did not build his cottage to last. The style in which he built his cottage requires small effort to rebuild. This symbolizes human nature to rebuild even though the feats of their labor would soon be taken away by nature. In essence, Chōmei does not believe any effort is necessary to create something since there is no value in what one builds. Chōmei spent his eremitic life in hermitage. The only way in which he could avoid being trapped by materialistic reasons. He did not spend much effort in the construction of his house in order to be detached from his “dwelling.” Chōmei constructed a temporal dwelling in order to distance himself from any fear or regrets.

Sphere
Chōmei refers to The Sphere as “an environment which leads him to impiousness.” The Sphere relies on the human senses to determine it, and it can be different for each individual to define. The Sphere (kyogai) was originally a term that was used in Buddhism, but it was influenced by Japanese culture to involve the environment, circumstances, or surrounding things. Chōmei believes that The Sphere is not impious, but The Sphere itself is the cause of his impiousness.

Significance in Recluse Literature
In order to understand recluse literature's influence on Asian culture, it must be determined why recluses decide to forsake society and cast off into the wilderness at all. According to Li Chi's “The Changing Concept of  the Recluse in Chinese Literature”, men had various reasons to go into seclusion. Some believed that in secluding themselves they would find some sort of personal ascension and a better understanding of life, away from the material drives of the world, and even more so after the rise of Buddhism. Others found that seclusion would garner them more attention, status, and material gain, a direct contrast to the idea of personal and/or Buddhist piety. Some men made the transition into the wilderness because their structured life had been so terribly destroyed by natural disasters that they had no other choice but to do so. In the context of Chōmei's pilgrimage, we find Chōmei searching for asylum from the downtrodden society he once lived in, in the unstructured pursuit of Buddhist understanding. Recluses in Asian antiquity were revered for their writing because their works introduced those in society to a point of view not cluttered by the conformed ideals of societal life. Because there were various reasons behind intellectuals retiring into the wilderness, we are left with a wealth of knowledge in various writings from the multitude of intellectuals and transcendentalists that secluded themselves in the wilderness, preserved over the years and translated.

Manuscripts
 Unusually for works of the period, Chōmei's original manuscript survives. Numerous copies have been made and circulated, some complete and some abridged. The complete editions are further categorized into old and popular, while the abridge editions are categorized into Chōkyō, Entoku, and Mana. The Chōkyō and Entoku editions are named after the era date in the afterword and both include extra passages. The Mana editions are written entirely in kanji replacing the  kana in the kohon editions.

Translations

Hōjōki is one of the earliest Japanese classical works that was brought to the attention of Western readership, mainly because of its Buddhist elements. The first mention of the work in English language goes as far back as to 1873, when Ernest Mason Satow in an article on Japan briefly mentioned this work while discussing Japanese Literature. However, the first English translation of the work was attempted by Natsume Sōseki in 1891, one of the most prominent Japanese literary figures in modern times. He translated the work into English upon the request of James Main Dixon, his English literature professor at Tokyo Imperial University. Dixon consequently came out with his own translation of the work that was mostly based on Sōseki's translation. Later on William George Aston, Frederick Victor Dickins, Minakata Kumagusu, and many others translated the work into English again. Notable modern translations were prepared by Yasuhiko Moriguchi & David Jenkins (1998), Meredith McKinney (2014), and Matthew Stavros (2020). The work has also been translated into many other foreign languages.

See also
 Chiteiki
 Shimogamo Shrine (a model of the Hut described in Hōjōki is located in Kawai Jinja section of the shrine.)

Notes

References
Stavros, Matthew (2020). Hōjōki: A Hermit's Hut as Metaphor. Vicus Lusorum. ISBN 978-0645393200. 
Stavros, Matthew (2022). In Praise of Solitude: Two Japanese Classics on Reclusion. Chiteiki by Yoshishige no Yasutane, and Hōjōki by Kamo no Chōmei''. ISBN 978-0645393224

External links
 Hōjōki, original text at Aozora Bunko 
 English translation of Hōjōki by Robert N. Lawson in 2001, on Washburn University website
 Hojoki (Eremitorium): Latin Translation, by Alexander Ricius
 Reception of Hōjōki with a focus on Sōseki's English translation, by Gouranga C Pradhan
 Chasing a Recluse: Kamo no Chōmei

1212 books
Early Middle Japanese texts